Next Level Sports is an American sports-oriented cable and satellite television channel. The network also operates an online presence under the alternate brand For the Fans (FTF).

History 

In March 2017, the U.S. international sports channel One World Sports was replaced by Eleven Sports Network with no advance announcement. One World Sports' staff had been furloughed as a cost-cutting measure in November 2016, and it was reported that the network was exploring a sale.

On March 16, 2017, Eleven Sports officially announced that it had acquired "certain distribution assets" of One World Sports. Financial details of the sale were not disclosed. Group Marketing Director Danny Menken explained that Eleven planned to target rights to niche international sports that have fanbases in the United States (as opposed to its business model in other territories, where Eleven targets the top international sports rights in smaller markets).

In response to questions surrounding employees and freelancers of One World Sports that had not yet been paid for their work, he emphasized that they had only acquired "certain distribution assets", and that "people that have issues with [GA-SW] have to contact management, but we have no shares or relationship beyond the acquisition of distribution assets."

In March 2018, started to live stream on Twitch with select programing called Eleven Sports Prime. It would rebrand to Eleven Sports Next by the end of the year. On March 21, 2019, it was announced Eleven Sports was added on free OTT service Xumo. Pluto TV added Eleven Sports on July 23, 2019. The online feeds do not carry the full Eleven Sports schedule, as several sporting events are blacked out and not allowed to be distributed online; filler programs are substituted during such programs.

Programming 
Prior to the 2017 season, Eleven reached deals to broadcast Big Sky Conference, Ivy League, Southland Conference, and UMass Minutemen college football games. The UMass games are simulcast on NESN and online. Eleven also reached deals to televise 14 UMass men's basketball and hockey games, with the majority airing on either NESN or NESN Plus, and one on NBC Sports Boston. Eleven Sports lost the rights to UMass sports to FloSports in August 2019.

Eleven's Big Sky contract includes weekly games in football and men's basketball, as well as some conference tournament games for men's and women's basketball, and women's soccer, volleyball, and softball. Eleven Sports also announced a partnership with Twitter to stream 7 of its Ivy League football games during the 2017 season.

The network acquired U.S. rights to Belgian First Division A soccer, and Spain's Liga ACB basketball. On January 9, 2018, Eleven announced a partnership to televise 120 NBA G League games in the 2017–18 season.

In March 2021, the cable and satellite channel was rebranded as Next Level Sports; its online presence, which has been branded as For the Fans since 2019, retained that brand.

Broadcasting rights

Basketball

Professional
NBA G League
Chinese Basketball Association 
Liga ACB
Copa del Rey de Baloncesto

College
Big Sky Conference
Ivy League
Southland Conference

Football

Men
A7FL
Big Sky Conference
Frontier Conference
Ivy League
Southland Conference
A7FL
National Arena League
The Spring League
European League of Football

Women
Women's Football Alliance

Soccer
K League 1
Austrian Football Bundesliga

Baseball
Canadian American Association of Professional Baseball
Australian Baseball League
 Pacific League (NPB)

Ice hockey
Swedish Hockey League

Rugby
Collegiate Rugby Association of America
Division 1-A Rugby
Freetail 7's

Combat sports
 Kings Promotions
 Karate Combat
 Fite TV
 United Fight Alliance
 OVW Wrestling

Motorsport
International GT Open
Formula America
Race Max (30 minute highlights)

Esports
 BLAST Pro Series
 Simulation Football League
 Major League Rugby Virtual

Others

 Archery
 Billiards
 Cornhole
 Drones DCL
 Sports Unlimited
 Hempel Sailing World Cup
 Mania
 Water Polo
Squash
Planet X

On-air staff

Current on-air staff
 Andrew Gilford (also known as FC TIGHTO)

References

External links
 
Twitch Channel

Television channels and stations established in 2017
Sports television networks in the United States